The Saltash Tunnel is a road tunnel on the A38 at Saltash in Cornwall, UK and was opened in 1988.

The central lane operates as a reversible lane to cope with holiday and rush hour traffic and the speed limit is 30 mph. The tunnel is used by more than 38,000 motorists per day and is 410 m long. It was designed by Mott, Hay and Anderson, built by Balfour Beatty, and has a design life of at least 100 years.

Construction

During construction of the tunnel a problem was encountered with flooding due to the saturation of the surrounding rocks. The resultant flow of water was channelled through the tunnel, hidden by a decorative cladding. Within a few months this cladding had begun to crack and water entered the part of the tunnel reserved for traffic; although no structural problems were found the water staining on the cladding gave the impression of a poorly built tunnel. This was commented upon in Parliament by the local MP, Colin Breed, and a £7.4 million renovation project was contracted to Skanska to provide for a new tunnel lining and improvements to the electrical system.

See also

 List of tunnels in the United Kingdom

References

Roads in Cornwall
Tunnels in Cornwall
Road tunnels in England
Tunnels completed in 1988